David Christian Lamb (born June 6, 1975) is an American former professional baseball infielder. He played three seasons in the Major League Baseball (MLB) for the Tampa Bay Devil Rays, New York Mets and Minnesota Twins.

External links 

Baseball Almanac

1975 births
Living people
Albany Polecats players
American expatriate baseball players in Canada
Baseball players from California
Bowie Baysox players
Calgary Cannons players
Carolina Mudcats players
Colorado Springs Sky Sox players
Durham Bulls players
Edmonton Trappers players
Frederick Keys players
Gulf Coast Orioles players
High Desert Mavericks players
Major League Baseball infielders
Major League Baseball shortstops
Minnesota Twins players
New York Mets players
Norfolk Tides players
People from West Hills, Los Angeles
Rochester Red Wings players
Tampa Bay Devil Rays players